The Enbo Bridge is a historic stone arch bridge over the Xianpu River in , Fuyang District of Hangzhou, Zhejiang, China.

History
The first known instance of the bridge being documented appeared in the Song dynasty (907–1279). It was rebuilt as a stone bridge by magistrate Shi Yangde in 1565 during the Ming dynasty (1368–1644). In August 1997, it has been inscribed as a provincial-level cultural heritage site by the Government of Zhejiang.

References

Bridges in Zhejiang
Arch bridges in China
Bridges completed in 1565
Ming dynasty architecture
Buildings and structures completed in 1565
1565 establishments in China